The MIKTA Speakers' Consultation 2015 took place in Seoul, Republic of Korea on July 1–5 under the theme "Parliamentary Leadership for a Global Future." Initiated by Chung Ui-hwa, Speaker of the National Assembly of the Republic of Korea, the MIKTA Speakers' Consultation 2015 was the inaugural meeting of the parliamentary Speakers of MIKTA, a middle-power consultative mechanism.

Overview 
The MIKTA Speakers' Consultation is a consultative body of the parliamentary Speakers of MIKTA (Mexico, Indonesia, Korea, Turkey, and Australia). The Speakers of the MIKTA parliaments gather together for a plenary and bilateral meetings on an annual basis. Discussions are underway for the possible establishment of other cooperative mechanisms. No rules and regulations are in place as yet to govern the date and venue of the Consultation. Decisions on the next meeting are made when the Speakers get together for the annual meeting. In the case of a bicameral legislature, participation is not restricted either to the upper or lower chambers. Members of parliament can join official delegations as well as diplomats based in the host country. The President of the Senate of the United Mexican States, the Chairman of the Regional Representatives Council of the Republic of Indonesia (upper chamber), and the President of the Senate of the Commonwealth of Australia attended the 1st MIKTA Speakers' Consultation, which was held in Seoul, 2015. The Turkish Grand National Assembly was represented by the Turkish Ambassador to Seoul due to the delayed schedule to elect a new Speaker, MPs, diplomats and academics.

History 
Chung Ui-hwa, Speaker of the Korean National Assembly, took the initiative to create the parliamentary counterpart of MIKTA, an inter-governmental consultative body. The subsequent approval of the other Speakers led to the official launch of the Consultation. Speaker Chung Ui-hwa put forward the initial proposal to the President of the Turkish Grand National Assembly in October, 2014 during the official visit of the Turkish Speaker to Seoul. The Turkish side agreed to the proposal. Speaker Chung followed up by sending letters to his counterparts in the MIKTA parliaments to gather views on the initiative. As the Speakers expressed their support, the proposal came to fruition. The 1st MIKTA Speakers' Consultation was held in Seoul on July 1–5, 2015 and the main conference took place on July 2.

Brief Timeline of the Preparation Process

Summary of the Consultation

Date and Venue 
 Period: July 1–5, 2015 
 Venue: Seoul, Republic of Korea
 Host: National Assembly of the Republic of Korea

Participation 

※ The Turkish Grand National Assembly was represented by H.E. Arslan Hakan Okçal, Turkish Ambassador to Seoul, as the Turkish Grand National Assembly elected its Speaker on July 1.

Sessions and Main Issues 

1. Theme of the Consultation
 Parliamentary Leadership for a Global Future

2. Session Topics
 Session I: Role of the Parliaments of Middle Powers in Implementing the Sustainable Development Goals(SDGs) 
 The participants reiterated the significant role of middle power nations and their legislatures in implementing SDGs while stressing that the MIKTA countries should exert their collective power and influence by sharing best practices and expanding cooperation.
 Session II: Regional Issues
 Mexico:  Challenges to Economic Development; Security and Combating Organized Crime; and Migration and Human Rights
 Indonesia: SWOT Analysis of Regional Issues Facing the MIKTA Countries
 Republic of Korea: 70th Anniversary of the End of World War II and Lasting Peace and Prosperity in Northeast Asia
 Turkey: Concerted Efforts of the International Community to Put an Early End to the Civil War in Syria and Eradicate Extremism.
 Australia: Budget Allocation to Strengthen Security in Parliament Buildings and Efforts to Prevent Terrorist Threats
 Special Session of the Host Country: 70th Anniversary of the Division of the Korean Peninsula and Peaceful Reunification
 The keynote speech touched upon the significance of the 70th anniversary of the liberation and division of the Korean Peninsula as well as a vision for a unified Korea. It also introduced a cooperative model called "P6+A2" aimed to address the North Korean nuclear issue. P6+A2 refers to the parties involved in the Six Party Talks (P6) and the Asian Development Bank and the Asian Infrastructure Investment Bank (A2).
 The delegations reaffirmed the support of MIKTA for Korea's pursuit of a reunification diplomacy and the peaceful reunification of the Korean Peninsula. 
 Session III: Discussion on Future Plans for the Consultation and the Adoption of the Joint Statement 
 The Speakers adopted the Joint Statement and agreed to hold the Consultation on a regular basis.

Joint Press Conference 
Date: July 2(Thu.), 2015
Venue: Westin Chosun, Seoul
Participation: Speaker Chung Ui-hwa(Republic of Korea), President Luis Miguel Barbosa Huerta(Mexico), Chairman Irman Gusman(Indonesia), President Stephen Parry(Australia), Ambassador Arslan Hakan Okçal(Turkey)
Key Points: The Speakers of the MIKTA parliaments appreciated the significance of the 1st MIKTA Speakers' Consultation and announced the adoption of the Joint Statement, also known as the Seoul Statement.

Special Advisors' Review Session 
Review of the Consultation
 The Consultation was a success in that it provided an opportunity for the Speakers to identify the issues of common interest and demonstrated its potential as a consultative body among the parliamentary Speakers of the like-minded countries of MIKTA.
 The Seoul Statement presented a guidance for the future direction of the MIKTA Speakers' Consultation.
Recommendation
 The Consultation needs to identify specific issues related to the common challenges of the MIKTA countries as well as their individual strengths.
 In setting agendas for future meetings, the Consultation needs to exchange views with inter-governmental bodies and experts groups.

＊Special advisors are academics and professionals specializing in the agenda of the Consultation. Each delegation is allowed to recommend one special advisor.

Bilateral Talks 
Korea-Mexico Bilateral Talks
Date: July 3(Fri.), 08:30
Venue: Westin Chosun, Seoul

Korea-Indonesia Bilateral Talks
Date: July 1(Wed.), 18:00
Venue: Westin Chosun, Seoul

Korea-Australia Bilateral Talks
Date: July 1(Wed.), 18:40
Venue: Westin Chosun, Seoul

References

External links 
Official Website
Website of the National Assembly of the Republic of Korea

21st-century diplomatic conferences
Diplomatic conferences in South Korea
2010s in Seoul
2015 in South Korea
July 2015 events in South Korea